Maria Amalia of Saxony (26 September 1757 – 20 April 1831) was a Duchess consort of Zweibrücken by her 1774 marriage to Charles II August, Duke of Zweibrücken.

Life
Maria Amalia was one of nine children born to Frederick Christian, Elector of Saxony and Maria Antonia Walpurgis of Bavaria in Dresden. As her parents were first cousins, Maria Amalia was also a double great granddaughter of Joseph I, Holy Roman Emperor through her two grandmothers: Maria Josepha of Austria and Maria Amalia, Holy Roman Empress, who were sisters.

Duchess of Zweibrücken 

In Dresden 1774, Maria Amalia married Charles of Zweibrücken-Birkenfeld.  Previously, he had been bitterly rejected in 1768 as a husband for Maria Amalia of Austria by her mother Maria Theresa of Austria, who felt he was not suitable enough for her. Maria Amalia was thus Charles' second choice. His sister had already been married to Maria Amalia's brother Frederick since 1769.

Charles succeeded as Duke of Zweibrücken in 1775.

Maria Amalia and her husband had only one son, who died in childhood. Charles' brother Maximilian inherited his title upon Charles' death in 1795.

Death
Maria Amalia died on 20 April 1831 in Neuburg, outliving her husband by 36 years.

Ancestry

References

1757 births
1831 deaths
House of Wettin
Nobility from Dresden
German duchesses
Albertine branch
Daughters of monarchs